Tharindu Eranga is a Sri Lankan international footballer who plays as a midfielder for Ratnam in the Sri Lanka Football Premier League.

References

Sri Lankan footballers
Ratnam SC players
1985 births
Living people
Sri Lanka international footballers
Association football midfielders
Sri Lanka Football Premier League players